André Aschieri (8 March 1937 – 6 December 2021) was a French politician. He served as mayor of Mouans-Sartoux from 1974 to 2015, was a member of the National Assembly from 1997 to 2002, and was Vice-President of Land and Housing of the Regional Council of Provence-Alpes-Côte d'Azur from 2004 to 2015.

Biography
Aschieri carried out his military service in the Algerian War from 1960 to 1962. Beginning his career as a math teacher, he was elected to the Municipal Council of Mouans-Sartoux in 1971. He became mayor in 1974 and was continuously re-elected in the first round of each election. As mayor, he became Vice-President of the  upon its foundation in 2001.

On 22 March 1992, he was elected to the Regional Council of Provence-Alpes-Côte d'Azur, although he resigned in 1995.

Aschieri was elected to the National Assembly in Alpes-Maritimes's 9th constituency on 1 June 1997 as part of The Greens (LV). He became Vice-President of AFSSET in 2003. He was particularly interested in the impacts of electromagnetic radiation on human health and the environment. In 2002, he was defeated in the second round by Union for a Popular Movement candidate Michèle Tabarot.

He was re-elected in 2010 and served as Vice-President of Land and Housing. He therefore resigned as Vice-President of the Pôle Azur Provence. He was also defeated in the 2007 legislative election again by Tabarot, who won in the first round.

Aschieri was a candidate in the 2009 European Parliament election as part of the Europe Ecology group, but failed to gain a seat. In 2012, he ran for the National Assembly as a candidate in Alpes-Maritimes's 2nd constituency. He qualified for the second round against , but was narrowly defeated. However, he was re-elected as mayor of Mouans-Sartoux in 2014 with 70.41% of the vote, becoming Vice-President of the Communauté d'agglomération du Pays de Grasse. However, he resigned from this post in May 2015, citing health reasons. His son, Pierre, succeeded him as mayor and was re-elected in 2020 with 76.86% of the vote.

André Aschieri died in Mouans-Sartoux on 6 December 2021 at the age of 84.

Publications
La France toxique (1999) 
Propositions pour un renforcement de la sécurité sanitaire environnementale : rapport au Premier ministre (1999) 
Alerte sur les portables (2001)  
Silence, on intoxique ! (2005) 
Mon combat contre les empoisonneurs (2010)

Distinctions
 (1982)
Knight of the Ordre national du Mérite (1985)
Commander of the Ordre des Arts et des Lettres (2012)
Officer of the Legion of Honour (2013)

References

1937 births
2021 deaths
People from Alpes-Maritimes
The Greens (France) politicians
Members of the National Assembly (France)
Mayors of places in Provence-Alpes-Côte d'Azur
French environmentalists
Recipients of the Legion of Honour
Knights of the Ordre national du Mérite
Commandeurs of the Ordre des Arts et des Lettres